The women's singles tennis event at the 2019 Summer Universiade was held from 5 to 13 July at the Circolo Tennis and Lungomare in Naples, Italy.

Japan's Naho Sato won the gold medal, defeating Great Britain's Emily Arbuthnott in the final, 6–4, 6–4.

Hong Kong's Eudice Chong and Thailand's Chompoothip Jundakate won the bronze medals.

Seeds
All seeds receive a bye into the second round.

Draw

Finals

Top half

Section 1

Section 2

Section 3

Section 4

Bottom half

Section 5

Section 6

Section 7

Section 8

References
Main Draw

Women's singles